Lake Achinos or Lake Tachinos, which was drained in 1932 by the Monks-Ulen company, was located in Serres Prefecture. It is identified with ancient Lake Cercinitis.

References

Landforms of Serres (regional unit)
Former lakes of Europe
Lakes of Greece